Betul ke Bohong? (colloquial Malay for True or false?) is a Malaysian game show-formatted comedy television program provided in the Astro satellite television network which is broadcast every Monday at 10pm on Astro Warna.

Format
Betul Ke Bohong is a celebrity panel show based on reality and the story may be true or not. A team must provide a statement and the opponent has to guess the correct statement to lie if they guess wrong statement, members of the group or the group leader will be punished will be an electric shock. Two groups of 2 people artistes who are also represented by Jepp Sepahtu and Shuib Sepahtu. They will battle to get top marks for their respective groups.

Seasons

Season One

Season Two

Season Three

See also 
 https://web.archive.org/web/20130922181314/http://www.astrogempak.com.my/ArticleDetails/tabid/597/ArticleID/43469/Betul-Ke-Bohong.aspx
 https://web.archive.org/web/20130920024433/http://m.utusan.com.my/Hiburan/20120824/hi_02/AC-terkilan
 https://web.archive.org/web/20130920024429/http://m.utusan.com.my/Hiburan/20120522/hi_08/Shuib-tanpa-Sepahtu
 http://kosmo.com.my/kosmo/content.asp?y=2012&dt=0906&pub=Kosmo&sec=Hiburan&pg=hi_02.htm

Malaysian game shows
2012 Malaysian television series debuts
2012 Malaysian television series endings
2010s Malaysian television series
Astro Warna original programming